Aloysius Arabao Iyomogo Edrick Amwano (also called Ali Amwano; born 21 June 1955) is a Nauruan politician.

Successive reversals of electoral fortune

Amwano started his parliamentary career in 1998, when he won a vacated seat in a by-election for the Ubenide Constituency following the resignation of former president Lagumot Harris.

2000, 2001 & 2003 polls

In the 2000 general elections he was re-elected; during a political crisis in 2001 all four Ubenide members lost their seats in parliament, but along with two colleagues Amwano subsequently regained the seat in the following by-election. He was the Speaker of the Parliament of Nauru from 29 March 2001 to 30 March 2001. He served as Minister of Finance in the cabinets of René Harris between 2001 and 2003. After the 2003 general elections he lost his seat to Fabian Ribauw.

2008 & 2010 elections

In 2008 he was re-elected to parliament, ousting Ribauw. He became part of President Marcus Stephen's parliamentary majority, before switching over to the opposition in 2010. He was one of three non-Cabinet government MPs to switch to the opposition after benefiting from a trip to Singapore organised and paid for by the Australian company Getax, which buys Nauruan phosphate. Getax had just sought, unsuccessfully, to propose a loan to the Stephen government, with contractual clauses enabling it (the company) to take over Nauru's phosphate industry in the event that the government defaulted in repaying. Following the Getax-funded trip, Amwano and two other MPs withdrew their support for the government, joining the opposition and causing Parliament to be evenly split between government and opposition MPs. This resulted in fresh parliamentary elections in April 2010, in which Amwano retained his seat. On 30 June 2010, he was elected Speaker, and demanded that Stephen stand down as president. On 6 July, opposition MP Rykers Solomon joined the government, potentially giving it the numbers to re-elect Stephen, or to elect a new president from within its ranks. As Speaker, however, Amwano refused to allow the election for president (by MPs) to be held. Amwano was dismissed by Stephen the following day, but refused to relinquish his post. In a short parliamentary session held on 9 July, Deputy Speaker Landon Deireragea announced that he had assumed the Speaker's position in Amwano's place.

In October, the Nauruan government accused Getax of having paid significant sums of money to opposition MPs, and of having funded the opposition's election campaign. The Australian Federal Police investigated the allegations that Getax had bribed Nauruan MPs "to influence the political regime in Nauru in order to increase their stake in the country's phosphate". Amwano spoke up to defend Getax, denying any wrongdoing and adding that he "would be happy for the Australian Federal Police to investigate".

2013 Election
Amwano was defeated in the 2013 elections, and was replaced by Ranin Akua.

See also

 Politics of Nauru
 Elections in Nauru
 2008 Nauruan parliamentary election
 April 2010 Nauruan parliamentary election

References

Speakers of the Parliament of Nauru
Members of the Parliament of Nauru
Finance Ministers of Nauru
1955 births
Living people
20th-century Nauruan politicians
21st-century Nauruan politicians